Amherst Street is a Buffalo Metro Rail underground station located at the corner of Main and Amherst Streets. From May 18, 1985 to November 10, 1986, due to construction issues at LaSalle station, Amherst Street station served as the northern terminus. The station has been referenced by rapper Westside Gunn numerous times.

Bus connections
Located on a triangular tract of land bounded by Main Street to the east, Amherst Street to the north and Parker Avenue to the west, Amherst Street is one of four stations that does not offer an off-road bus loop, requiring passengers to board/debark using curbside stops (the other three being Humboldt-Hospital, Summer-Best and Allen/Medical Campus). When the station opened in May 1985, bus routes were modified to stop on one of the three sides of the station. Route 23 buses heading toward Bailey/Abbott Loop and route 32 buses heading towards Black Rock/Riverside Transit Hub do not board at the curb on the same side as the station, which is served by three bus routes:

  8 Main
  23 Fillmore-Hertel
  32 Amherst

Artwork
In 1979, an art selection committee was created, composed of NFTA commissioners and Buffalo area art experts, that would judge the artwork that would be displayed in and on the properties of eight stations on the Metro Rail line. Out of the 70 proposals submitted, 22 were chosen and are currently positioned inside and outside of the eight underground stations. Amherst station is home of three pieces of work, from Aleksandra Kasuba (New York City), Ray Hassard (Buffalo) and Robert Lawrance Lobe (New York City).

Notable places nearby

Amherst Street Station is near:
 All-High Stadium
 Bennett High School
 Buffalo Zoological Gardens
 Delaware Park
 Central Park Neighborhood
 Darwin D. Martin House Complex (Frank Lloyd Wright)
 Delaware Park Golf Course
 Tri-Main Center

References

External links
 Metro Rail Success
 Amherst Street entrance from Google Maps Street View
 Parker Avenue entrance from Google Maps Street View
 Main Street entrance from Google Maps Street View

Buffalo Metro Rail stations
Railway stations in the United States opened in 1985
1985 establishments in New York (state)
Railway stations located underground in New York (state)